The Police Patrol is a 1925 American silent crime film directed by Burton L. King and starring James Kirkwood, Edna Murphy and Edmund Breese.

Synopsis
A patrolman falls in love with a dressmaker, is ordered to arrest her when a doppelganger commits a series of robberies. He instead sets out to find the guilty woman.

Cast
 James Kirkwood as Officer Jim Ryan
 Edna Murphy as Alice Bennett / Dorothy Stone
 Edmund Breese as Tony Rocco
 Bradley Barker as Maurice Ramon
 Frank Evans as Buddy Bennett
 Joseph W. Smiley as Lieutenant Burke
 Robert McKim as Maurice Ramon
 Blanche Craig as Nora Mullen
 Edward Roseman as Chicago Charley
 Tammany Young as The Crasher
 Charles Craig as Perkins
 James Laffey as Inspector Regan
 Monya Andre as Mlle. Semononff

References

Bibliography
 Munden, Kenneth White. The American Film Institute Catalog of Motion Pictures Produced in the United States, Part 1. University of California Press, 1997.

External links
 

1925 films
1925 drama films
1920s English-language films
American silent feature films
Silent American drama films
American black-and-white films
Films directed by Burton L. King
Gotham Pictures films
1920s American films
English-language drama films